Mosweu is a surname of Botswanan origin. Notable people with the surname include:

 Itumaleng Moseki (born 1991), South African cricketer
 Itumeleng Moseki (born 1940), Anglican bishop of Kimberley and Kuruman
 Oganeditse Moseki (born 1979), Botswana sprinter

Surnames of Botswana